Sultan Ahmed (born June 18, 1977, in Karachi) is a Pakistani-born cricketer who plays for the Oman national cricket team. He is a right-handed batsman and wicketkeeper. He has made several appearances as a batsman in the 2005 ICC Trophy, and has also played first-class cricket and List A cricket for Karachi teams. He was the captain of Oman team when they qualified for ICC T20 World Cup 2016 which is to be played in India in March–April. He made his Twenty20 International debut for Oman against Afghanistan in the 2015 ICC World Twenty20 Qualifier tournament on 25 July 2015.

In January 2018, he was named as captain of Oman's squad for the 2018 ICC World Cricket League Division Two tournament.

References

External links
 
 

1977 births
Living people
Cricketers from Karachi
Omani cricketers
Oman Twenty20 International cricketers
Pakistani emigrants to Oman
Pakistani expatriates in Oman
Pakistani cricketers
Karachi Blues cricketers
Karachi Whites cricketers
Omani cricket captains
Wicket-keepers